Long Lost is the fourth studio album by American indie folk band Lord Huron. It was released on May 21, 2021, by Republic Records. The album received widespread acclaim from music critics who praised its poetic lyricism, somber production & refined vocal harmonies.

Release and promotion
In December 2020, the band announced a collection of live-streamed shows entitled Alive from Whispering Pines.

Track listing

Notes
 Tracks 3, 6, and 12 are interludes, and are not included in the track list on vinyl and cassette versions of the album.
 On physical releases, Allison Ponthier is credited as a featured vocalist in the song "I Lied".

Personnel
Band
 Ben Schneider – vocals
 Tom Renaud – guitar
 Miguel Briseño – bass, keyboards
 Mark Barry – drums

Charts

References

2021 albums
Lord Huron albums